Jae Suh Park (Korean: 박재서, born April 5, 1984) is an American actress who starred in the 2017 Netflix comedy series Friends from College.

Personal life
Park grew up in Lodi, California.

She is married to Randall Park, and they have one daughter. They live in the San Fernando Valley.

Filmography

Film

Television

References

External links
 

American film actresses
American television actresses
Living people
American writers of Korean descent
Place of birth missing (living people)
21st-century American actresses
American actresses of Korean descent
1984 births